John Randolph Tucker Jr. (June 29, 1914 – November 27, 2015) (nicknamed "Bunny") was an American attorney and politician who served as a member of the Virginia House of Delegates from 1950 to 1958, and later as a judge of the Circuit Court in Richmond.

Early and family life
He was born in Richmond, Virginia to the former Mary Byrd Harrison (1884–1959) and John Randolph Tucker Sr. (1879–1954). His paternal grandfather was Henry St. George Tucker III, and Bunny Tucker would be the sixth generation of lawyers and judges in the family.

Although other family members had attended Washington and Lee University for their undergraduate education, Bunny Tucker attended the Virginia Military Institute, graduating in 1937. During World War II, Tucker rose to the rank of lieutenant colonel, leading an Army tank crew which, among other European campaigns, liberated Mons, Belgium. He did attend and graduate from the Washington and Lee Law School after the war.

Career

References

External links

1914 births
2015 deaths
American centenarians
Democratic Party members of the Virginia House of Delegates
Men centenarians
J. Randolph Tucker Jr.
People from Richmond, Virginia
Washington and Lee University School of Law alumni
Virginia Military Institute alumni